No Nut November, often abbreviated to NNN, is an annual internet challenge of male sexual abstinence during the month of November. It originated in 2010 and grew in popularity on social media during and after 2017.

History 
Although No Nut November was originally intended to be satirical, some participants claim that abstaining from ejaculating and not watching pornography has health benefits. An Urban Dictionary entry for No Nut November was published in 2011, and, in 2017, the movement started to gain popularity on social media. It is associated with the NoFap community on Reddit, which encourages its members not to masturbate. The Reddit community /r/NoNutNovember grew from 16,500 subscribers in November 2018 to 52,000 subscribers in November 2019.

After some far-right public figures, including Paul Joseph Watson, promoted the campaign, E. J. Dickson of Rolling Stone suggested that the movement had been co-opted by the far-right. Vice criticized the challenge in 2018 after adherents sent threats to xHamster on Twitter, similarly saying it had been co-opted by far-right figures.

Destroy Dick December
Destroy Dick December is a related internet challenge following No Nut November which serves as a counterpoint, encouraging participants to take part in sexual activities such as intercourse and masturbation, after abstaining from them during the previous month. Each day, participants in the challenge ejaculate a number of times equal to the day's place in the month, starting with one "nut" on the first of December, and ending with 31 "nuts" on the final day. In total, that is 496 "nuts" in December.

See also

 The Contest, a Seinfeld episode about abstinence from masturbation
 Coitus reservatus, a form of sexual intercourse in which a man attempts to remain at the moment before ejaculation for as long as possible
 Movember, the growing of moustaches in November to raise awareness of men's health issues
 National Masturbation Day, originally held on May 7, 1995 as an event to honor Joycelyn Elders, it was later expanded to the month of May as International Masturbation Month

References

External links
 No Nut November on Reddit

Challenges
Internet memes introduced in the 2010s
Internet memes introduced in 2011
Sexuality and computing
November events
Anti-pornography movements 
Sexual abstinence
Opposition to masturbation
Orgasm

Internet memes